The Highwayman is a 1951 American historical adventure film directed by Lesley Selander and starring Philip Friend, Wanda Hendrix and Cecil Kellaway. The film was shot in Cinecolor and distributed by Allied Artists, the prestige subsidiary of Monogram Pictures. It was based on the poem of the same name by Alfred Noyes.

Plot
The Highwayman is an aristocrat who leads a band of criminals who steal from the wealthy to distribute to the needy. Their campaign is broadened when they discover that innocents are being kidnapped and sold into slavery in the colonies. The Highwayman is betrayed to the authorities, soldiers march to set an ambush, his lover Bess sacrifices herself to give warning and he is shot down on the highway as tries to take revenge.

Cast
Philip Friend as Jeremy  
Charles Coburn as Lord Walters 
Wanda Hendrix as Bess Forsythe  
Cecil Kellaway as Lord Herbert  
Victor Jory as Lord Douglas  
Scott Forbes as the Sergeant  
Virginia Huston as Lady Ellen Douglas  
Dan O'Herlihy as Robin  
Harry Morgan as Tim 
Albert Sharpe as Forsythe 
Lowell Gilmore as Oglethorpe 
Alan Napier as Barton
 Norma Varden as 	Dowager at Ball 
Robert Karnes as British soldier
 John Alderson as British Soldier

Production
The film was based on a poem by Alfred Noyes written in 1906. Film rights were owned by James Burkett, who sold them to Monogram Pictures in 1946. Monogram announced that Noyes would collaborate on  the script with Jack De Witt and Renautt Duncan and the budget was to be one million dollars.

Noyes said that the poem would be the last act, and that there would be a parallel storyline set in the present day about a woman who works at the tavern and has problems with her love life. Noyes wanted to do this to keep the tragic ending of the poem but also have a happy ending in the present day. He arrived in Hollywood in April 1947 to inspect the script.

In July 1947, the film was officially added to Monogram's production schedule, but filming was delayed. In April 1950, Monogram announced that it would likely film in June with Florence Marley and Rory Calhoun starring. In July 1950, Louis Hayward said that he would star in Dick Turpin's Ride based on the poem and a script by Robert Libot and Frank Burt, with Harry Joe Brown to produce. Filming was to start in September.

Filming continued to be pushed back. In January 1951, Monogram announced that Hal Chester and Bernard Burton would produce and Charles Coburn would be the film's star, with the script written by Henry Blankfort (who used the pseudonym Jan Jeffries because he had been blacklisted). Filming would start on February 19 under the direction of Lesley Selander at the Motion Picture Center. Wanda Hendrix then joined the cast, followed by Philip Friend shortly before rehearsals and filming started.

Noyes wrote in his autobiography that he was pleasantly surprised by "the fact that in this picture, produced in Hollywood, the poem itself is used and followed with the most artistic care." The film was released in the same year as Columbia Pictures' Dick Turpin's Ride (reissued as The Lady and the Bandit), also based on a poem by Noyes. Portions of the film were shot at the Corriganville Movie Ranch.

Burkett went on to buy the film rights to several other Noyes titles: Midnight Express, The Walking Shadows, Beyond the Desert, River of Stars and The Last Voyage.

Reception
The Los Angeles Times called the film "competent but undistinguished."

Notes

External links
 
 The Highwayman Catalog entry at the American Film Institute (AFI)

1951 films
1950s historical adventure films
American historical adventure films
Allied Artists films
Films based on poems
Cinecolor films
1950s English-language films
Films directed by Lesley Selander
Films scored by Herschel Burke Gilbert
American swashbuckler films
Films set in England
Films set in the 18th century
1950s American films